The 1992 Northeast Conference men's basketball tournament was held in March. The tournament featured the league's nine teams, seeded based on their conference record. Robert Morris won the championship, their fifth, and received the conference's automatic bid to the 1992 NCAA Tournament.

Format
The NEC Men’s Basketball Tournament consisted of a nine-team playoff format with all games played at the venue of the higher seed. The first round was played by the two lowest seeds and the other teams received a bye.

Bracket

All-tournament team
Tournament MVP in bold.

References

Northeast Conference men's basketball tournament
Tournament
Northeast Conference men's basketball tournament